Sweet and Hot is a 1955 studio album by Ella Fitzgerald, issued on the Decca Records label. The album features tracks recorded during the early 1950s, that had been previously issued on 78rpm single. MCA Records re-issued the complete album on CD, in 1998, together with the 1955 album Lullabies of Birdland.

Track listing

Personnel
Ella Fitzgerald – vocals
André Prévin and Orchestra – Track 1–4 (Recorded in 1955)
John Scott Trotter and His Orchestra – Track 5–6 (Recorded in 1953)
Benny Carter and band – Track 7–10 (Recorded in 1955)
Sy Oliver and His Orchestra – Track 11 (Recorded in 1952)

References

1955 albums
Ella Fitzgerald albums
Decca Records albums